Datuk M. Magendran PJN DSPN JSM KMN AMS (Tamil: எம். மகேந்திரன்) born Magendran M. Munisamy on
6 December 1963   in Kuala Lumpur, Malaysia) is the first Malaysian mountain climber to conquer the summit of Mount Everest. Magendran's party ascended the South Col on the southeast ridge. He stepped onto Everest's summit on 23 May 1997, at 11:55 a.m. local time. He was followed by N. Mohanadas (Mohanadas Nagappan), who reached the summit a few minutes later at 12:10 p.m. The two mountaineers were part of the first "Malaysia-Everest Project 97" jointly organised by the Malaysia Mountaineering Association and the Ministry of Youth and Sports of Malaysia.  Also with their team of ten people was M. Moorthy (Moorthy Maniam), a Malaysian of Indian descent.

Mount Everest is the world's highest mountain, with a peak at 8,848 metres (29,029 ft) above sea level. Its summit was first achieved in 1953 after numerous failed attempts that began in 1921. The first person to finally set foot on its summit was New Zealander Sir Edmund Hillary, who was accompanied by Tenzing Norgay of India.  Both M. Magendran and N. Mohanadas were conferred Datukships by the Penang state government in 2010 for their Himalayan achievement. Both men were also conferred the Federal 'Datukships' title by the King of Malaysia in Jun 2011.

In June 2013, Datuk Magendran, who is considered a pioneer among Malaysians, gave advice for those mountain climbers who would brave the hazards of the world's highest peak:

Magendran urged future climbers and trekkers not to overlook their health before and during the climb, adding that any symptom that was overlooked could be fatal.  He also reminded, "Trekkers should keep an eye on the health of their teammates, too."

The year 1997 also commemorated the 40th anniversary of Malaysian independence. In 2000, both M. Magendran and N. Mohanadas were pictured on their nation's postage stamps.

Magendran is a vice-principal in SMK USJ 8, in Subang Jaya. Being a Sports Science and Physical Education graduate, he also teaches Physical Education.
Since 2021, he is the principle in SMK Taman Sri Muda, Shah Alam.

`Malaysia Boleh!’ (Malaysia Can Do It!) 

The idea of `Malaysia Boleh!’ was first mooted in 1993 by Nestle and made its debut as part of a marketing campaign for Milo (drink), and a confidence boost for the Malaysian contingent during the 1993 Southeast Asia Games in Singapore.
The`Malaysia Boleh!’ slogan slowly gained influence as a signature battle cry in the mid-1990s when Prime Minister Mahathir Mohamad co-opted the catch phrase to spur the nation's Vision 2020. Likewise, the Malaysia-Everest `97 organizing committee also incorporated the phrase to its official expedition logo to instill a sense of confidence and perseverance among the climbers. And the force of the slogan worked both ways, it gave the climbers the competitive spirit to strive for excellence and the success of the expedition gave the much needed oomph to the `Malaysia Boleh! spirit. The slogan became more popular and inspired many Malaysians to embark on other adventures like the Read brothers who walked to the last degree of the North pole (1998), Dato' Azhar Mansor who sailed solo around the world (1999), Dato' Abdul Malik Mydin who swam across the English Channel (2003) and many more.
The stories of these exemplary Malaysians never cease to amaze the Prime Minister whenever he speaks about discipline, patience and over-coming challenges. Tun Dr. Mahathir Mohamad in his book, A Doctor in the House: The Memoirs of Tun Dr. Mahathir Mohamad (pg. 589) stated that:

Awards and recognition 
 On 29 May 2003, M. Magendran and N. Mohanadas (the only two Mount Everest summiteers from Malaysia) received the Mount Everest Golden jubilee Medals from the Honourable Prime Minister of Nepal, Lokendra Bahadur Chand. Both were invited by the Nepal Mountaineering Association (NMA) to be a part of the week-long celebration organized by the Nepal Government in conjunction with the 50th Anniversary of the conquest of Mount Everest in 1953.
 On 10 July 2010, M. Magendran was among 47 people who were conferred the Darjah Setia Pangkuan Negeri award (DSPN), which carries the title Datuk in conjunction with the 72nd birthday of the Penang State Governor Tun Abdul Rahman Abbas. Magendran was honoured along with teammate N. Mohanadas. Second Deputy Chief Minister of Penang Prof. Dr. Ramasamy Palanisamy   said the state government gave the awards to the duo to recognize their feat.
 On 4 June 2011, M. Magendran was honoured with the Distinguished Order of Meritorious Service (Darjah Panglima Jasa Negara) or PJN in conjunction with the birthday of His Majesty  Tuanku Mizan Zainal Abidin, the 13th King of Malaysia. Magendran was among 67 people who were conferred the PJN award which carries the title Datuk.
 On 23 May 2017, Both M. Magendran and N. Mohanadas together with other team members of Malaysia-Everest 97 expedition were honoured in an event “Two decades of first Malaysians on Everest” organised by The Malaysian Indian Sports and Cultural Foundation (MISCF) and Ministry of Youth and Sports (Malaysia) to commemorate the 20th anniversary of their historic feat.

Honours

Honours of Malaysia 
  :
 Commander of the Order of Meritorious Service (PJN) – Datuk(2011)
 Companion of the Order of Loyalty to the Crown of Malaysia (JSM) (2004)
  Officer of the Order of the Defender of the Realm (KMN) (1997)
  :
  Officer of the Order of the Defender of State (DSPN) – Datuk (2010)
  :
 Member of the Order of the Crown of Selangor (AMS) (1999)

See also 
 List of climbers and mountaineers
 List of notable Malaysians
 List of notable Tamil people
 Timeline of climbing Mount Everest – 1997

References

External links 
 M. Magendran on Netlog
 M. Magendran's Facebook page
 PressReader.com – Your favorite newspapers and magazines.

1963 births
Living people
Malaysian people of Indian descent
Malaysian Hindus
Malaysian mountain climbers
Summiters of Mount Everest